Operation Jubilee was the Allied code name for the raid at Dieppe on the French coast on August 19, 1942. The following order of battle lists the significant military units that participated in the battle, or were available as reserve.

Allied

Ground forces
The landing force commander was Major-General John Roberts, the commander of the 2nd Canadian Infantry Division.
 2nd Canadian Infantry Division
 4th Canadian Infantry Brigade - Brigadier Sherwood Lett
 The Essex Scottish Regiment
 The Royal Hamilton Light Infantry
 The Royal Regiment of Canada
 5th Canadian Infantry Brigade
 Three platoons of The Black Watch (Royal Highland Regiment) of Canada
 Mortar Platoon of The Calgary Highlanders
 6th Canadian Infantry Brigade - Brigadier William Southam
 Les Fusiliers Mont-Royal (Floating reserve)
 The Queen's Own Cameron Highlanders of Canada
 The South Saskatchewan Regiment
 No. 6 Defence Platoon (Lorne Scots)
 14th Army Tank Regiment (The Calgary Regiment [Tank])
 Detachment of 3rd Light Anti-Aircraft Regiment, Royal Canadian Artillery (RCA)
 Detachment of 4th Field Regiment, RCA
 The Toronto Scottish Regiment (Machine Gun)
 No. 3 Commando (British Army), John Durnford-Slater
 No. 4 Commando (British Army), Lt-Col Simon Fraser, 15th Lord Lovat
 No. 10 Inter-Allied Commando (French speakers attached to other units.as interpreters)
 A Commando Royal Marines
 No. 30 Commando (intelligence gathering)

In addition a detachment of the 1st U.S. Ranger Battalion was assigned as observers to various units

Naval forces
The naval forces were under the command of Captain John Hughes-Hallett RN.

Eight s:
 
 - support to Calpe, controlled low fighter cover squadrons under Acting Squadron Leader, J. H. Scott, also "First Rescue Ship"
 
 
  - Headquarters ship
  - reserve HQ ship
 
  (Polish Navy)
  - gun boat, "Cutting Out Force" carrying RM Commandos
 9th Minesweeper Flotilla
 13th Minesweeper Flotilla
 Nine landing ships, infantry each with a number of landing craft
HMS Duke of Wellington "Landing Ship, Infantry (Hand-Hoisting)", 
  - Landing Ship, Infantry (Large) 
 -  Landing ship, Infantry (Small)
HMS 

 - Landing Ship, Infantry (Medium)

  
 

Supporting elements  came from Royal Navy Coastal Forces
 12 Motor Gun Boats
 4 Steam Gun Boats of the 1st SGB Flotilla.
 20 Motor Launches

Air forces
The Allied air forces were under the command of Air Vice Marshal Trafford Leigh-Mallory. The Deputy Senior Air Staff Officer in the group, Group Captain Harry Broadhurst flew "air observation" at Dieppe.

  11 Group RAF Fighter Command
 48 Spitfire squadrons
 No. 19 Squadron RAF
 No. 41 Squadron RAF
 No. 43 Squadron RAF
 No. 64 Squadron RAF, Spitfire IX, Hornchurch
 No. 66 Squadron RAF
 No. 71 Squadron RAF (one of the three "Eagle Squadrons" flown by Americans in the RAF), RAF Gravesend
 No. 81 Squadron RAF
 No. 87 Squadron RAF
 No. 91 Squadron RAF
 No. 111 Squadron RAF
 No. 121 (Eagle) Squadron RAF  RAF Southend
 No. 122 Squadron RAF, Hornchurch
 No. 124 Squadron RAF, Spitfire HF VI
 No. 129 Squadron RAF
 No. 130 Squadron RAF
 No. 131 Squadron RAF
 No. 133 (Eagle) Squadron  RAF Lympne
 No. 134 Squadron RAF
 No. 154 Squadron RAF
 No. 165 Squadron RAF
 No. 222 Squadron RAF
 No. 232 Squadron RAF
 No. 242 Squadron RAF
 302 "City of Poznań" Polish Fighter Squadron
 303 "Kościuszko" Polish Fighter Squadron
 306 "City of Toruń" Polish Fighter Squadron
 308 "City of Kraków" Polish Fighter Squadron
 No. 310 (Czechoslovak) Squadron, Spitfire Vb
 No. 312 (Czechoslovak) Squadron, Spitfire Vb
 317 "City of Wilno" Polish Fighter Squadron, Spitfire Vb
 No. 331 (Norwegian) Squadron, Spitfire Vb
 No. 332 (Norwegian) Squadron, Spitfire Vb
 No. 340 (GC/IV/2 Ile de France) Squadron (French), Spitfire Vb, Hornchurch
 No. 350 (Belgian) Squadron (Belgian), Spitfire Vb
 No. 401 Squadron RCAF, Lympne
 No. 403 Squadron RCAF
 No. 411 Squadron RCAF
 No. 412 Squadron RCAF
 No. 416 Squadron RCAF
 No. 501 Squadron RAF
 No. 602 Squadron RAF
 No. 610 Squadron RAF
 No. 611 Squadron RAF
 No. 616 Squadron RAF
 Eight squadrons for ground attack 
 No. 3 Squadron RAF Hurricane IIC
 No. 32 Squadron RAF Hurricane IIB, IIC, S/L Thorn
 No. 43 Squadron RAF Hurricane, RAF Tangmere, S/L Danny Le Roy du Vivier (Belgian)
 No. 87 Squadron RAF Hurricane 
 No. 174 Squadron RAF Hurricane
 No. 175 Squadron RAF Hurricane
 No. 245 Squadron RAF Hurricane
 No. 253 Squadron RAF Hurricane
 Three Hawker Typhoon squadrons
 No. 56 Squadron RAF
 No. 266 Squadron RAF Typhoon IB, West Malling
 No. 609 Squadron RAF Typhoon IB, West Malling
 RAF Army Cooperation Command, No. 35 Wing
 No. 26 Squadron RAF -  Mustang I, RAF Gatwick
 No. 239 Squadron RAF - Mustang I
 No. 400 Squadron RCAF - Mustang I, W/Cdr Waddell
 No. 414 Squadron RCAF -Mustang I, W/Cdr Begg
 RAF Army Cooperation Command, No. 36 Wing
 No. 13 Squadron RAF Bristol Blenheim  light bomber (laying smoke)
 RAF Army Cooperation Command, No. 32 Wing
 No. 614 Squadron RAF Bristol Blenheim  light bomber (laying smoke)
 A squadron with Bristol Beaufighter 
 No 418 (City of Edmonton) Squadron RCAF Douglas Boston  
 No. 2 Group RAF (RAF Bomber Command)
 No. 88 Squadron RAF Boston III,  RAF Ford (tactical bombing)
 No. 107 Squadron RAF Boston III, RAF Ford (tactical bombing)
 No. 226 Squadron RAF Boston III, RAF Thruxton. (laying smoke)

 USAAF Eighth Air Force
 97th Bombardment Group (B-17Es), Grafton Underwood
 340th Bombardment Squadron
 341st Bombardment Squadron
 342nd Bombardment Squadron
 414th Bombardment Squadron
 31st Fighter Group (Spitfires)
 307th Fighter Squadron
 308th Fighter Squadron
 309th Fighter Squadron

The RAF Air Sea Rescue Service also operated some aircraft.

German

Heer
 302nd Static Infantry Division ( Konrad Haase), part of LXXXI Army Corps, Army Group D, defending the coast at Dieppe.
 570th Infantry Regiment
 571st Infantry Regiment
 572nd Infantry Regiment
 302nd Artillery Regiment
 302nd Reconnaissance Battalion
 302nd Antitank Battalion
 302nd Engineer Battalion
 216th Battery
 813th Battery
 2/770 Army Coastal Battery
 Heavy Flak Group

Reserves not participating in the battle:
 676th Infantry Regiment of the 332nd Static Infantry Division
 10th Panzer Division
 SS Infantry Brigade

Luftwaffe
 Jagdgeschwader 2 (2nd Fighter Wing)
 Jagdgeschwader 26 (26th Fighter Wing)
 Kampfgeschwader 2 (2nd Bomber Wing)
 II./Kampfgeschader 40 (II. Group/40th Bomber Wing)
 1.(F)/123 Reconnaissance

Notes

Footnotes

References

Further reading
 

World War II orders of battle
Jubilee order of battle